UFO Tofu is the third album by Béla Fleck and the Flecktones, released in 1992. The title is a palindrome, which is also a musical theme in the title track; the idea originated with the musician Baby Gramps.

Production
The album was produced by Fleck, Roy Wooten, Howard Levy, and Victor Wooten. "Bonnie & Slyde" is a tribute to Bonnie Raitt and her slide guitar mastery. "Sex in a Pan" was inspired by a dessert offered at a restaurant in North Carolina.

Critical reception

The Indianapolis Star deemed the album "a savory blend of jazz, country and world beat—with a generous dollop of funk, just for fun." The Morning Call stated that it "blends the Flecktones' high-tech electronics with Fleck's lyrical, often melodic playing."

In his AllMusic review, music critic Thom Owens wrote of the album: "Though the Flecktones didn't change their formula with their third album, UFO Tofu, they did manage to craft one of their more consistent and impressive efforts... Occasionally, the material is lightweight, functioning only as vehicle for the group's solos. Then again, the whole point of Fleck's music is the solos, so that shouldn't upset his fans too much. Of course, it doesn't help him win new ones, either."

Track listing
All songs by Béla Fleck unless otherwise noted.
"The West County" – 4:30
"Sex in a Pan" (Victor Wooten) – 3:33
"Nemo's Dream" – 5:07
"Bonnie & Slyde" – 4:18
"Scuttlebutt" – 4:04
"UFO Tofu" – 3:46
"Magic Fingers" – 5:13
"True North" – 4:54
"Life without Elvis" – 5:06
"Seresta" (Howard Levy, Manfredo Fest) – 3:39
"The Yee-Haw Factor" – 6:57
"After the Storm" – 3:52

Personnel
Béla Fleck – acoustic (tracks 1-3, 6-8, 11, 12), slide (track 4), electric (track 5) & nylon strung (tracks 9, 10) banjos, synth (track 9)
Howard Levy – diatonic harmonicas (G, A, Bb, C & D) (tracks 1-4, 7, 9-12), synth (track 7), piano (tracks 1, 3, 4, 6-8, 10), synthesizers (tracks 1, 3-5, 9, 12), Hammond B3 Organ (tracks 7, 11), pennywhistle (track 8) & ocarina (track 11)
Future Man – Synth-Axe Drumitar
Victor Wooten – 4 string bass, 5 string bass, 5 string fretless bass (tracks 1, 4, 12), stereo effect (tracks 2, 7) & tenor bass (tracks 8, 10)
Bil VornDick – engineer

Chart positions

References

Béla Fleck and the Flecktones albums
1992 albums
Warner Records albums